José Carlos Gaspar Ferreira (born 7 September 1943), known as Zé Carlos, is a Brazilian former footballer.

References

1943 births
Living people
Brazilian footballers
Association football defenders
Botafogo de Futebol e Regatas players
Pan American Games medalists in football
Pan American Games gold medalists for Brazil
Footballers at the 1963 Pan American Games
Medalists at the 1963 Pan American Games